is a Japanese speed skater. He competed at the 1992 Winter Olympics and the 1994 Winter Olympics.

References

1967 births
Living people
Japanese male speed skaters
Olympic speed skaters of Japan
Speed skaters at the 1992 Winter Olympics
Speed skaters at the 1994 Winter Olympics
Sportspeople from Hokkaido
Speed skaters at the 1990 Asian Winter Games
Medalists at the 1990 Asian Winter Games
Asian Games medalists in speed skating
Asian Games gold medalists for Japan
20th-century Japanese people